Aalam is a surname. Notable people with the surname include:

Mohammad Shams Aalam Shaikh (born 1986), Indian Para swimmer
Mohammed Aftab Aalam (born 1962), Nepalese politician
Mujeeb Aalam (1948–2004), Pakistani playback singer
Shabab Aalam (born 1984), Indian author, educationalist and satirist

See also
Alam
Kot Aalam, village in Sindh, Pakistan